Leslie is a station on Line 4 Sheppard of the Toronto subway system. It is located at 1209 Sheppard Avenue East at Old Leslie Street in Toronto, Ontario, Canada. It was opened in 2002. Wi-Fi service is available at this station.

History
Leslie station opened for public viewing on November 22, 2002, along with the rest of the Sheppard subway line and for revenue service on November 24, 2002.

Station description

The station is on three levels. The bus platforms are on the upper level at Old Leslie Street, with an automatic accessible entrance. The concourse and collector are at an intermediate level, where the main fully accessible entrance is located on the south side of Sheppard Avenue East west of Leslie Street. There is a secondary automatic accessible entrance at the corner of Leslie Street directly to the easterly end of the subway platform, which is at the lowest level.

The station features 102 spaces of commuter parking. Cost is $7 per day or $2 per hour from 5:00 am to 2:00 am daily. As with all TTC lots, no overnight parking is allowed between 2:00 am and 5:00 am.

Architecture and art

The public art in the station, entitled Ampersand (2002) and created by Canadian artist Micah Lexier, consists of 17,000 ceramic tiles each with a printed ampersand and above and below it the words "Sheppard" and "Leslie", based on 3,400 different pieces of handwriting from the community collected in 1997.

According to the artist's statement posted in the station, this piece of artwork "acknowledges the duality of being both an individual and part of a larger community." This piece can be seen on both the concourse and platform levels, including the bus terminal.

Subway infrastructure in the vicinity

Just east of the station, the line emerges from the subway tunnel to cross the Don River East Branch on a fully enclosed bridge, then returns into the tunnel. West of the station, the subway continues through its tunnels into Bessarion station.

Nearby landmarks
Nearby landmarks include the East Don River, the Betty Sutherland Trail, North York General Hospital and the Canadian College of Naturopathic Medicine (formerly Seneca College's School of Nursing).

Surface connections

Toronto Transit Commission

TTC routes serving the station include:

A bus terminal, located one level above the concourse, is integrated with Leslie station. Although the terminal is quite spacious and has several bus bays, it currently only serves the 51 Leslie route. The 85 Sheppard East route can only be boarded on the street with a valid transfer.

GO Transit
Leslie station is located north of Oriole Station on GO Transit's Richmond Hill line, but they are not adjacent. No action has yet been taken on proposals to relocate the GO Station to connect directly with the subway. Passengers wishing to transfer to the GO Station are directed to the exit outside the bus terminal; a short walk to the intersection of Old Leslie Street and Esther Shiner Boulevard brings pedestrians to a walkway which connects to the north end of the GO platform.

References

External links

Line 4 Sheppard stations
Railway stations in Canada opened in 2002
2002 establishments in Ontario